The Hard Rock Hotel Amsterdam American, also known for its Café Américain, on Leidseplein in Amsterdam, Netherlands, is a hotel and café restaurant with a Jugendstil reading room.

History
It was built in 1898–1900 by W.Kromhout and H.G. Jansen in the Berlage style. In 1927–1928 an expansion was realised from a design by the architect G.J. Rutgers in collaboration with K. Bakker in 1927–1928. Both the expansion and the café are National Heritage sites.

References

External links
Hard Rock Hotel Amsterdam American

Hotel buildings completed in 1900
Rijksmonuments in Amsterdam
Hotels in Amsterdam
Art Nouveau architecture in Amsterdam
Art Nouveau hotels